Scrub oak is a common name for several species of small, shrubby oaks. It may refer to: 

the Chaparral plant community in California, or to one of the following species.

In California

California scrub oak (Quercus berberidifolia), a widespread species commonly referred to as scrub oak
Coastal scrub oak (Quercus dumosa), although currently defined in a narrow sense, has been applied to other scrub oaks now considered separate species

Other California species referred to as "scrub oaks"
Leather oak (Quercus durata)
Tucker oak (Quercus john-tuckeri)
Island scrub oak (Quercus pacifica)

In the Southwestern United States
Coahuila scrub oak (Quercus intricata), in the US, it is reported at only two sites: One in the Chisos Mountains inside Big Bend National Park, and the other 15 miles SW of Van Horn. 
Gambel oak (Quercus gambelii)
Gray oak (Quercus grisea), in the mountains of the southwestern United States and northern Mexico.
Emory oak (Quercus emoryi)
Pungent oak (Quercus pungens)
Sonoran scrub oak (Quercus turbinella)

In the Northeastern United States
Bear oak (Quercus ilicifolia)
Britton's Oak (Quercus ×brittonii), a hybrid of Bear oak (Quercus ilicifolia) and Blackjack oak (Quercus marilandica)
Dwarf Chinkapin (Quercus prinoides), distribution extends to Midwest and South-Central U.S.

In the Southeastern United States
Chapman oak (Quercus chapmanii)
Myrtle oak (Quercus myrtifolia)
Sandhill oak (Quercus inopina)
Sand live oak (Quercus geminata)
Turkey oak  (Quercus laevis)
See also Florida scrub

Europe
Kermes oak (Quercus coccifera)
Gall oak (Quercus lusitanica)

Others
Santa Cruz Island oak (Quercus parvula)

Quercus